Haliotis varia, common name the variable abalone or the common ear shell, is a species of sea snail, a marine gastropod mollusk in the family Haliotidae, the abalones.

Description
The size of the shell varies between 22 mm and 70 mm. It is shiny and the colour varies from something like mother of pearl to pink to red to gray to blue.

Distribution
This marine species occurs in the Red Sea and in the Indo-West Pacific, off Tanzania, Mauritius and in the Mascarene Basin. It further occurs in the Western Pacific, from Sri Lanka to Tonga and off Australia (Northern Territory, Queensland and Western Australia)

Records from East Africa and India are questionable according to Geiger & Poppe, 2000

References

 Röding, P.F. 1798. Museum Boltenianum sive Catalogus cimeliorum e tribus regnis naturae quae olim collegerat Joa. Hamburg : Trappii 199 pp.
 Reeve, L.A. 1846. Descriptions of forty species of Haliotis, from the collection of H. Cumming, Esq. Proceedings of the Zoological Society of London 14: 53-59
 Dunker, W. 1863. Novitates Conchologicae. Mollusca Marina. Beschreibung und Abbildung neuer oder wenig gekannter Meeres-Conchylien. Cassel : T. Fischer pp. 43–58, pls 13-18.
 Pilsbry, H.A. 1890. Manual of Conchology. Philadelphia : Academy of Natural Sciences Philadelphia Vol. 12 323 pp., 65 pls.
 Iredale, T. 1929. Queensland molluscan notes, No. 1. Memoirs of the Queensland Museum 9(3): 261-297, pls 30-31 
 Wilson, B. 1993. Australian Marine Shells. Prosobranch Gastropods. Kallaroo, Western Australia : Odyssey Publishing Vol. 1 408 pp.
 Hylleberg, J & Kilburn, R.N. 2003. Marine Molluscs of Vietnam: Annotations, voucher material , and species in need of verification. Phuket Marine Biological Center Special Publication 28: 1-299

External links
 To Barcode of Life (1 barcode)
 To Biodiversity Heritage Library (55 publications)
 To Encyclopedia of Life
 To GenBank (22 nucleotides; 15 proteins)
 To World Register of Marine Species
 

varia
Gastropods described in 1758
Taxa named by Carl Linnaeus